A cheese sandwich is a sandwich made with cheese on bread. Typically semi-hard cheeses are used for the filling, such as Cheddar, Red Leicester, or Double Gloucester. A Guardian article called the cheese sandwich a "British lunchtime staple". Using a sandwich toaster or frying pan can transform the cheese sandwich into a cheese toastie. 

When a meat sandwich is prepared, the cheese becomes the accompaniment, and the sandwich is known by other names such as ham sandwich, tuna sandwich, etc. If the cheese is melted on such a sandwich, the term melt sandwich is used.

Variants 
Popular British variants include the cheese and pickle sandwich, the cheese and tomato sandwich and the cheese and onion sandwich.

A grilled cheese sandwich is a popular American cheese sandwich, in which the sandwich is heated until the cheese melts.

An Italian variation is the carrozza, a mozzarella cheese sandwich coated in egg and flour and fried.

Popularity 
By 2014 the cheese sandwich was declining in popularity in the United Kingdom. A survey of 2,000 adults’ eating habits by YouGov in December 2014 found that 55% of British adults had not eaten a cheese sandwich during the previous week. In response, in 2015 Anchor Cheddar launched a campaign, using a bus designed to look like a cheese sandwich, to encourage the consumption of this type of food.

In 2017, a survey by YouGov found that 36% of British people said that cheese is their favourite sandwich filling, and in 2018, a survey of 2000 British people, found that a plain cheese sandwich was the most popular type of sandwich. By 2020 however, a similar study showed that the plain cheese sandwich had become less popular and the bacon sandwich was the favourite.

Health warnings 
In 2008, the Food Standards Agency warned that one cheese sandwich contains more than half the recommended daily amount of saturated fat.

In 2012, Action on Salt campaigned for cheese sandwiches to come with a health warning. The group reported, that the high quantities of salt, contained in the main ingredients of a cheese sandwich, could lead to children consuming an excessive amount. In response, the Dairy Council said that it was wrong to say that cheese sandwiches are not good for you. Action on Salt later withdrew the press release, citing an error.

Research 
A study by Len Fisher at the University of Bristol in 2003, found that the optimum thickness for the filling in a cheese sandwich is dependent on the type of cheese used, and that the sandwich should be made with a light spread of butter or margarine to enhance the flavour of the cheese.
This research has drawn criticism for being 'frivolous'.

History 
While the original invention of the cheese sandwich is not known to be documented, some interpretations of William Shakespeare's 1602 play, The Merry Wives of Windsor report that the line "I love not the humour of bread and cheese" was the first written reference to a cheese sandwich.

In January 1889, in Greenville, Pennsylvania, Henry Hoffman, George Smith and Teddy Atkins took part in a cheese sandwich eating contest. Hoffman won the contest, eating 16 sandwiches in 15 minutes.

In popular culture 
 
The 1903, British short silent documentary film, called The Cheese Mites, features a man making a cheese sandwich and examining it with a magnifying glass as its main storyline.

See also 

 List of sandwiches
 Grilled cheese

References

External links

American sandwiches
British sandwiches
Cheese dishes
 
World cuisine